The Lyubinsky constituency (No.141) is a Russian legislative constituency in Omsk Oblast. The constituency covers upstate northern Omsk Oblast, in 2015 redistricting the constituency took Sovetsky District of Omsk from Central constituency but gave southwestern Omsk Oblast to Moskalenki constituency.

Members elected

Election results

1993

|-
! colspan=2 style="background-color:#E9E9E9;text-align:left;vertical-align:top;" |Candidate
! style="background-color:#E9E9E9;text-align:left;vertical-align:top;" |Party
! style="background-color:#E9E9E9;text-align:right;" |Votes
! style="background-color:#E9E9E9;text-align:right;" |%
|-
|style="background-color:"|
|align=left|Oleg Zharov
|align=left|Independent
|
|28.11%
|-
|style="background-color:"|
|align=left|Aleksandr Luppov
|align=left|Independent
| -
|15.00%
|-
| colspan="5" style="background-color:#E9E9E9;"|
|- style="font-weight:bold"
| colspan="3" style="text-align:left;" | Total
| 
| 100%
|-
| colspan="5" style="background-color:#E9E9E9;"|
|- style="font-weight:bold"
| colspan="4" |Source:
|
|}

1995

|-
! colspan=2 style="background-color:#E9E9E9;text-align:left;vertical-align:top;" |Candidate
! style="background-color:#E9E9E9;text-align:left;vertical-align:top;" |Party
! style="background-color:#E9E9E9;text-align:right;" |Votes
! style="background-color:#E9E9E9;text-align:right;" |%
|-
|style="background-color:"|
|align=left|Sergey Manyakin
|align=left|Power to the People
|
|21.09%
|-
|style="background-color:"|
|align=left|Vladimir Vorotnikov
|align=left|Agrarian Party
|
|20.94%
|-
|style="background-color:"|
|align=left|Gennady Baranov
|align=left|Our Home – Russia
|
|17.89%
|-
|style="background-color:"|
|align=left|Yevgeny Rokhin
|align=left|Liberal Democratic Party
|
|8.27%
|-
|style="background-color:#DA2021"|
|align=left|Oleg Zharov (incumbent)
|align=left|Ivan Rybkin Bloc
|
|6.96%
|-
|style="background-color:#016436"|
|align=left|Khakim Sadykov
|align=left|Nur
|
|3.95%
|-
|style="background-color:#3A46CE"|
|align=left|Ivan Folyak
|align=left|Democratic Choice of Russia – United Democrats
|
|3.33%
|-
|style="background-color:#2998D5"|
|align=left|Reingold Ruts
|align=left|Russian All-People's Movement
|
|2.85%
|-
|style="background-color:"|
|align=left|Vladimir Frish
|align=left|Independent
|
|1.89%
|-
|style="background-color:"|
|align=left|Aleksandr Resnenko
|align=left|Independent
|
|0.91%
|-
|style="background-color:#000000"|
|colspan=2 |against all
|
|10.20%
|-
| colspan="5" style="background-color:#E9E9E9;"|
|- style="font-weight:bold"
| colspan="3" style="text-align:left;" | Total
| 
| 100%
|-
| colspan="5" style="background-color:#E9E9E9;"|
|- style="font-weight:bold"
| colspan="4" |Source:
|
|}

1999

|-
! colspan=2 style="background-color:#E9E9E9;text-align:left;vertical-align:top;" |Candidate
! style="background-color:#E9E9E9;text-align:left;vertical-align:top;" |Party
! style="background-color:#E9E9E9;text-align:right;" |Votes
! style="background-color:#E9E9E9;text-align:right;" |%
|-
|style="background-color:"|
|align=left|Aleksandr Podgursky
|align=left|Independent
|
|36.08%
|-
|style="background-color:"|
|align=left|Vladimir Dorokhin
|align=left|Communist Party
|
|31.40%
|-
|style="background-color:#E2CA66"|
|align=left|Svetlana Volchanina
|align=left|For Civil Dignity
|
|8.89%
|-
|style="background-color:"|
|align=left|Gennady Girich
|align=left|Yabloko
|
|3.96%
|-
|style="background-color:#FF4400"|
|align=left|Aleksey Alekseytsev
|align=left|Andrey Nikolayev and Svyatoslav Fyodorov Bloc
|
|2.61%
|-
|style="background-color:"|
|align=left|Yury Shadrin
|align=left|Independent
|
|2.45%
|-
|style="background-color:#020266"|
|align=left|Vladimir Yepanchintsev
|align=left|Russian Socialist Party
|
|1.67%
|-
|style="background-color:#000000"|
|colspan=2 |against all
|
|11.09%
|-
| colspan="5" style="background-color:#E9E9E9;"|
|- style="font-weight:bold"
| colspan="3" style="text-align:left;" | Total
| 
| 100%
|-
| colspan="5" style="background-color:#E9E9E9;"|
|- style="font-weight:bold"
| colspan="4" |Source:
|
|}

2003

|-
! colspan=2 style="background-color:#E9E9E9;text-align:left;vertical-align:top;" |Candidate
! style="background-color:#E9E9E9;text-align:left;vertical-align:top;" |Party
! style="background-color:#E9E9E9;text-align:right;" |Votes
! style="background-color:#E9E9E9;text-align:right;" |%
|-
|style="background-color:"|
|align=left|Sergey Vorobchukov
|align=left|Independent
|
|74.91%
|-
|style="background-color:"|
|align=left|Vladimir Dorokhin
|align=left|Communist Party
|
|13.91%
|-
|style="background-color:"|
|align=left|Vasily Leonov
|align=left|Agrarian Party
|
|2.28%
|-
|style="background:#1042A5"| 
|align=left|Leonid Makushin
|align=left|Union of Right Forces
|
|2.27%
|-
|style="background-color:#000000"|
|colspan=2 |against all
|
|5.50%
|-
| colspan="5" style="background-color:#E9E9E9;"|
|- style="font-weight:bold"
| colspan="3" style="text-align:left;" | Total
| 
| 100%
|-
| colspan="5" style="background-color:#E9E9E9;"|
|- style="font-weight:bold"
| colspan="4" |Source:
|
|}

2016

|-
! colspan=2 style="background-color:#E9E9E9;text-align:left;vertical-align:top;" |Candidate
! style="background-color:#E9E9E9;text-align:left;vertical-align:top;" |Party
! style="background-color:#E9E9E9;text-align:right;" |Votes
! style="background-color:#E9E9E9;text-align:right;" |%
|-
|style="background-color: " |
|align=left|Andrey Golushko
|align=left|United Russia
|
|43.10%
|-
|style="background-color:"|
|align=left|Oleg Denisenko
|align=left|Communist Party
|
|23.44%
|-
|style="background-color:"|
|align=left|Aleksey Lozhkin
|align=left|Liberal Democratic Party
|
|11.37%
|-
|style="background-color:"|
|align=left|Aleksandr Kravtsov
|align=left|A Just Russia
|
|6.38%
|-
|style="background:"| 
|align=left|Aleksandr Podzorov
|align=left|Communists of Russia
|
|4.69%
|-
|style="background-color:"|
|align=left|Sergey Kochetkov
|align=left|Party of Growth
|
|1.64%
|-
|style="background:"| 
|align=left|Boris Melnikov
|align=left|Yabloko
|
|1.59%
|-
|style="background:"| 
|align=left|Olga Argat
|align=left|People's Freedom Party
|
|1.58%
|-
|style="background:"| 
|align=left|Aleksey Yakimenko
|align=left|Rodina
|
|1.16%
|-
|style="background:"| 
|align=left|Oleg Kolesnikov
|align=left|Civic Platform
|
|1.13%
|-
| colspan="5" style="background-color:#E9E9E9;"|
|- style="font-weight:bold"
| colspan="3" style="text-align:left;" | Total
| 
| 100%
|-
| colspan="5" style="background-color:#E9E9E9;"|
|- style="font-weight:bold"
| colspan="4" |Source:
|
|}

2021

|-
! colspan=2 style="background-color:#E9E9E9;text-align:left;vertical-align:top;" |Candidate
! style="background-color:#E9E9E9;text-align:left;vertical-align:top;" |Party
! style="background-color:#E9E9E9;text-align:right;" |Votes
! style="background-color:#E9E9E9;text-align:right;" |%
|-
|style="background-color: " |
|align=left|Oksana Fadina
|align=left|United Russia
|
|42.63%
|-
|style="background-color:"|
|align=left|Konstantin Tkachev
|align=left|Communist Party
|
|19.33%
|-
|style="background:"| 
|align=left|Vladimir Kazanin
|align=left|Communists of Russia
|
|10.22%
|-
|style="background-color: " |
|align=left|Yevgeny Podvorny
|align=left|New People
|
|7.03%
|-
|style="background-color:"|
|align=left|Vladimir Lifantyev
|align=left|A Just Russia — For Truth
|
|6.28%
|-
|style="background-color: "|
|align=left|Olga Dobash
|align=left|Party of Pensioners
|
|5.40%
|-
|style="background-color:"|
|align=left|Maksim Makalenko
|align=left|Liberal Democratic Party
|
|4.63%
|-
| colspan="5" style="background-color:#E9E9E9;"|
|- style="font-weight:bold"
| colspan="3" style="text-align:left;" | Total
| 
| 100%
|-
| colspan="5" style="background-color:#E9E9E9;"|
|- style="font-weight:bold"
| colspan="4" |Source:
|
|}

Notes

References

Russian legislative constituencies
Politics of Omsk Oblast